Hoczew  ( or , Hichva or Hochiv) is a village in the administrative district of Gmina Lesko, within Lesko County, Subcarpathian Voivodeship, in south-eastern Poland.

The village has a population of 710.

References

Villages in Lesko County